Gekko gigante, also known as the Gigante narrow-disked gecko or the  Gigante gecko, is a species of gecko found in the Gigantes Islands in Carles, Iloilo Philippines.

References

gigante
Reptiles of the Philippines
Fauna of the Visayas
Reptiles described in 1978